Lonah Korlima Chemtai Salpeter (born 12 December 1988) is a Kenyan-Israeli runner. She won the bronze medal in the marathon at the 2022 World Athletics Championships. At the European Athletics Championships, Chemtai took victory in the 10,000 metres in 2018 and earned bronze in 2022. She won the 2020 Tokyo Marathon.

Her personal best time for the marathon is 2:17:45, which when she ran it in 2020 made her the sixth-fastest woman in history (currently 11th), the second-fastest European all-time, and set a new Israeli national record. Chemtai represented Israel at the 2016 Rio and 2020 Tokyo Olympics. As of November 2022 she held six Israeli national records over distances ranging from 3000 metres to marathon.

Early and personal life
Lonah Chemtai was born and raised in Kenya, a member of the tribe of the Kalenjin, and grew up in a small village without electricity or running water in West Pokot County in western Kenya.  She came to Israel in 2008, to work as a nanny for the children of Kenya's Ambassador to Israel residing in Herzliya.

She met Israeli running coach Dan Salpeter in 2011, and the two married in 2014.  The couple's son, Roy, was born in December 2014. The family resided in moshav Yanuv, in central Israel, and now resides in Shoham in central Israel. Chemtai became an Israeli citizen in March 2016 on account of marriage to an Israeli citizen, eight years after she began residing in Israel, and a few days before the cut-off to qualify for the 2016 Summer Olympics.

Running career
Chemtai's husband, an Israeli former middle-distance and mountain runner, is also her coach. In her youth she ran shorter distances, and began running marathons only after 2014. Her club is Maccabi Tel Aviv.

2016–17
Chemtai came in first among the women in the 2016 Tel Aviv Marathon in 2:40:16, almost five minutes below the qualification time for the 2016 Olympics.

She competed for Israel at the 2016 Summer Olympics in the marathon. By the 30th kilometer, her time put her in the top half of the runners, ranking her approximately 90th. She left the race at the 33rd kilometer. She explained on Facebook: “Unfortunately, I was forced to stop by a shoulder problem. As you all know, I’m still nursing my 20-month-old son. During my training in Kenya, I tried to stop, but it caused me pain and a shoulder problem due to running with breasts full of milk. This limited me in the European championships in Amsterdam (a half-marathon) and happened again today. I promise to attain respectable achievements in the future and am going forward with head held high.”

In the 2017 London World Championship Marathon, she ran a 2:40, coming in 41st.

2018–20
In May 2018, Chemtai won the European 10,000 m Cup in London, with a time of 31:33.03, a new Israeli national record. In July, she won the 1500 m at the Israeli National Championships with a time of 4:11.69.

On 8 August 2018, Chemtai won the 10,000 metres at the European Athletics Championships in Berlin with a time of 31:43.29. She became the first Israeli athlete to win a gold medal at the championships. Four days later, Chemtai miscounted the number of laps in her second competition there and stopped a lap early by mistake in the 5000 metres race in which she had been in close second place, depriving her of a medal.

On 25 November 2018, she won the Florence Marathon, setting an Israeli national record and course record of 2:24:17. It was only her fifth marathon. As of November 2018 Chemtai also held Israeli national records for 1500, 3000, 5000, and 10,000 metres as well as the half marathon.

In March 2019, she won the Roma-Ostia Half Marathon in Rome, Italy, with a time of 1:06:40. In April, she came in second in the Sportisimo Prague Half Marathon in Prague, with a time of 1:06:09. On 5 May, she won the Prague Marathon, with a course record 2:19:46 time, clocking the 24th-best time for a woman in that distance in history, the third-best European time ever, and a new Israeli national record.

In July, she won a silver medal in the 2019 European 10,000 m Cup in London, with an Israeli national record of 31:15.78. In September at the Tilburg Ten Miles in Netherlands, she broke the European record in the 10 kilometres with a time of 30:04, the second-fastest women's time ever recorded for the distance, slicing 17 seconds off the previous record set by Paula Radcliffe in 2003.

On 28 September, she ran the women's marathon at the IAAF World Championships in Doha.

In March 2020, Chemtai medalled in her first World Marathon Major as she triumphed in the women's elite race at the Tokyo Marathon with a time of 2:17:45, setting a new course and Israeli record.

2021
In February, Chemtai won the Tuscany Camp Half Marathon in Siena, Italy, with a time of 1:07:09. On 14 March, she won the Agmon Hahula Marathon in Hula Valley with a time of 2:22:37 and qualified to represent Israel at the delayed 2020 Tokyo Summer Olympics.

On 6 August, Chemtai stood 66th in the women's marathon at the Tokyo Games with a time of 2:48:31. She was in the front pack of runners with four kilometers to go when she had to pause due to menstrual cramps. She said:

2022
At the European Athletics Championships in Munich in August, Chemtai Salpeter won the bronze medal for Israel in the 10,000 metres race and set an Israeli record. In November, she placed second at the New York City Marathon, only seven seconds behind the debutante winner Sharon Lokedi.

Achievements

International competitions

Personal bests
 3000 metres – 8:42.88 (Birmingham 2018) 
 5000 metres – 14:59.02 (London 2019)
 10,000 metres – 30:46.37 (Munich 2022) 
 One hour run – 18,571 metres (Brussels 2020) 
 10 km – 30:05 (Tilburg 2019) 
 Half marathon – 1:06:09 (Prague 2019) 
 Marathon – 2:17:45 (Tokyo 2020)

See also
List of Israeli records in athletics

References

External links

 

1988 births
Living people
People from West Pokot County
Israeli female marathon runners
Israeli female long-distance runners
Kenyan female long-distance runners
Kenyan female marathon runners
Olympic athletes of Israel
Athletes (track and field) at the 2016 Summer Olympics
European Athletics Championships winners
Israeli people of Kenyan descent
Kenyan emigrants to Israel
Naturalized citizens of Israel
Athletes (track and field) at the 2020 Summer Olympics
20th-century Kenyan women
21st-century Kenyan women
20th-century Israeli women
21st-century Israeli women
Tokyo Marathon female winners